Felled seam, or flat-fell seam, is a seam made by placing one edge inside a folded edge of fabric, then stitching the fold down. The fold encases the raw edges protects them from fraying. The fold may be secured with a topstitch or a whipstitch. It is useful for keeping seam allowances flat and covering raw edges. 

The flat-felled seam is the type of seam used in making denim jeans, although it appears inside-out to reduce stitching. It is also used in traditional tipi construction. 

There are flat-felled seams and lap-felled seams.
A flat-felled seam can be used on various fabrics, not just denim. It can even be used on delicate fabrics such as voile.

References

Sewing
Needlework
Seams